Buffalo Creek is a stream in the U.S. state of South Dakota.

A variant name was Buffalo Skin Creek. The stream's name comes from the Sioux Indians of the area, after the buffalo they hunted.

See also
List of rivers of South Dakota

References

Rivers of Dewey County, South Dakota
Rivers of South Dakota